Japan competed at the 2013 World Aquatics Championships in Barcelona, Spain between 19 July and 4 August 2013.

Medalists

Diving

Japan qualified four quota places for the following diving events:

Men

Women

Open water swimming

Japan qualified three quota places for the following events in open water swimming:

Swimming
Japanese swimmers achieved qualifying standards in the following events (up to a maximum of 2 swimmers in each event at the A-standard entry time, and 1 at the B-standard): The Among the official roster featured former Olympic champion Kosuke Kitajima and undisputed superstar Kosuke Hagino.

Men

Women

Synchronized swimming

Japan qualified 11 quota places for each of the following synchronized swimming events.

References

External links
Barcelona 2013 Official Site

Nations at the 2013 World Aquatics Championships
2013 in Japanese sport
Japan at the World Aquatics Championships